Westside Xtreme Wrestling, commonly shortened to wXw, is a German professional wrestling promotion based in Gelsenkirchen, North Rhine-Westphalia. wXw has been one of the leading professional wrestling promotions in Germany, and most of its events have been held in the Ruhr district, primarily in Oberhausen. Since 2013, wXw regularly tours throughout Germany, adding tour stops outside the country including Switzerland, the Czech Republic and the United Kingdom.

History 
Westside Xtreme Wrestling was founded on December 24, 2000, by Peter Wiechers, a professional wrestler with the ring name Hate. Together with SigMasta Rappo, Tyrant, Mark Hammer, Blue Adonis, Barish, Thunder and Claudio Castagnoli, he held an event called "wXw Extreme Wrestling Party" in the disco "Roxy" in Essen. wXw has become one of the most notable professional wrestling promotions in Germany.

In 2016, wXw became the first German wrestling promotion with an on demand service similar to WWE's network, called wXwNOW.

wXwNOW
wXwNOW is a subscription-based video streaming service owned by German professional wrestling promotion Westside Xtreme Wrestling (wXw). In 2016, wXw started "wXwNOW", a new worldwide streaming site for the promotion's events. All major wXw events air live on the service, which also features matches from the promotion's archives, dating back to 2002. wXwNOW Network operates similarly to WWE Network. The service has a current monthly subscription price of €9.99.

Co-promotion 
Since its creation, wXw has developed working relationships with several American promotions including Chikara, Pro Wrestling Guerrilla, Beyond Wrestling, Combat Zone Wrestling (CZW) and Evolve and several Japanese promotions including Dragon Gate, Pro Wrestling Noah, Dramatic Dream Team and Big Japan Pro Wrestling. Through the working relationship with wXw, Big Japan's World Strong Heavyweight Championship features both the CZW and wXw logos. 

wXw has also maintained relationship withs several European-based promotions, including British promotions International Pro Wrestling: United Kingdom, Preston City Wrestling, All Star Wrestling, and Progress Wrestling.

wXw has held several interpromotional events, including Gorefest – European King of the Death Matches 2006 took place in the United Kingdom, a hardcore-focused event co-promoted with the English-based X-Sports: Wrestling. The second Gorefest, held in 2009, included a title match between Drake Younger and Devon Moore for Combat Zone Wrestling's Heavyweight Championship.

The 2008 event Dead End VIII featured the Japanese-based Pro Wrestling Noah and its rosters such as KENTA, Go Shiozaki, Takashi Sugiura and Kenta Kobashi. The 2009 events, Open the Spanish Gate and Open The German Gate
took place in Barcelona, Spain and Oberhausen, Germany, respectively, were co-promoted with the Japanese-based Dragon Gate.

On March 13, 2010, wXw held its first event in the US, The Vision took place in front of an audience of over 450 at The Arena in Philadelphia, Pennsylvania. The event also featured a title match for one of CZW's titles, the CZW Ultraviolent Underground Championship, along with wXw's famous feud being between Thumbtack Jack and Drake Younger.

On April 8, 9, and 10, 2011, wXw held its second and third events in the USA first with F1 vs. wXw on April 8 in Egg Harbor Township, New Jersey, USA at the Spontaneous Sports Complex and wXw Kreuzzug ZXI day 1 being in Philadelphia, Pennsylvania in the Asylum Arena and day 2 being in Union City, New Jersey in the ACE Arena.

On July 24, 2014, wXw started a partnership with Jeff Jarrett's Global Force Wrestling promotion which ended in 2017 due to GFW ending.

On July 18, 2015, New Japan Pro-Wrestling started a working relationship with wXw as part of New Japan's international expansion plans which ended in early 2016 due to wXw working with too many promotions, not having any collaborated events, not being in NJPW events in Europe, not having wXw titles being defended in NJPW events and no talent exchanges.

On July 2, 2018, wXw started a working relationship with WWNLive, with wXw becoming an official partner of the WWN Training Center. Later that year on October 1, a relationship with WWE began.

On April 4, 2019 wXw held its fourth event in the US, wXw Amerika Ist Wunderbar Live From New York City took place in La Boom in Queens, New York.

Tournaments and accomplishments

16 Carat Gold Tournament

16 Carat Gold Tournament is a single-elimination tournament annually held by the wXw. The sixteen-man tournament was first conceived by wXw in 2006 and has been held every year since then.

16 Carat Gold 2020

The wXw 16 Carat Gold Tournament of 2020 was a three-night event which started on March 6 and culminated on March 8.

Other accomplishments

wXw Catch Grand Prix 2020
wXw Catch Grand Prix was a tournament consisting of two blocks of seven participants each. The tournament started on October 26 and culminated on December 13. The matches are disputed in five rounds and each one grants two points for the winner and one point for each competitor if the result is a draw by reaching the time limit. There is a fifteen minute time limit for each match. The digits next to the time indicate the round in which the match ended.

Notes
[1][2]

Contracts

Championships and accomplishments

Current championships

Defunct championships

wXw Hall of Fame
The wXw Hall of Fame is a German professional wrestling hall of fame maintained by the Oberhausen-based promotion Westside Xtreme Wrestling (wXw). It was established in 2005 to honor wrestlers who have wrestled for the promotion.

Inductees

wXw Academy 
In 2016, wXw opened the first German wrestling academy with a seven-days course schedule in Essen. The wXw Academy training is open for members as well as guests that can also book a stay in an apartment adjoined to the academy. With "Scouting the next Generation", the wXw Academy introduced a series of monthly events in 2015 that provides trainees of the academy the opportunity to perform in front of a crowd.

In August 2022, the wXw Wrestling Academy moved to Gelsenkirchen.

See also

 List of professional wrestling promotions in Europe

References

External links 

  
 wxwNOW (German wrestling network)
Official MySpace
Westside Xtreme Wrestling at Online World of Wrestling
Westside Xtreme Wrestling at Wrestling-Titles.com

 
Entertainment companies established in 2000
German professional wrestling promotions
2000 establishments in Germany